Kondakarla Ava is a famous Lake and Bird Sanctuary in Visakhapatnam of Andhra Pradesh state in South India. It comprises a unique and endangered forest type. It is located in the foothills of Eastern Ghats.

Geography
Kondakarla Ava is located in Anakapalli District of Andhra Pradesh, in Kondakarla village, Atchutapuram Mandal. It  is managed by the Andhra Pradesh Tourism Development Corporation and Kondakarla Panchayat.
The Sanctuary comprises a unique and endangered forest type and the wet evergreen forests. It is recognized as an Eco Tourism destination, with an area of 405 km^2

Flora and Fauna 
Wet evergreen forest type with species like Shelducks, Common Teals, Northern Pin Tails and Asian Open Bills are found in the sanctuary and Typha angustata, Nymphoides indica, Azolla filiculoides, Pistia stratiotes are also found here.

References

Bird sanctuaries of Andhra Pradesh
Tourist attractions in Visakhapatnam
Geography of Visakhapatnam
Protected areas with year of establishment missing
Lakes of Andhra Pradesh